The Comper Aircraft Company Ltd was a 1930s British light aircraft manufacturer. It was based at Hooton Aerodrome, Cheshire (1929-1933), and Heston Aerodrome, Middlesex (1933-1934).

History
In April 1929, after leaving the Royal Air Force, Nicholas Comper formed the Comper Aircraft Company Ltd, based at Hooton Park Aerodrome near Ellesmere Port in Cheshire. Company directors included his brother Adrian Comper, his colleague Flt Lt J. Bernard Allen, George H Dawson, the owner of Hooton Park Aerodrome, and others. The company's first product was the Comper Swift, a single-seat sporting monoplane. After the prototype flew in January 1930, 40 production examples were built at Hooton. In 1932, in a joint venture, the company produced a prototype of the Cierva C.25 autogyro, using major elements of a Comper Swift.

In March 1933, after producing about 41 aircraft, the company moved to Heston Aerodrome near London. The first aircraft built at Heston was the Mouse, that first flew in September 1933. Other single examples produced at Heston were the Comper Streak and Comper Kite.

After an expensive move in a financial depression, and new aircraft designs but few sales, the company ceased trading in August 1934. Most of the directors resigned, including Nick Comper, and a new board was formed, headed by Sir Norman J Watson and Brindley 'Bryn' R.S. Jones. The company was renamed Heston Aircraft Company Ltd, effective 10 August 1934.

Aircraft
 1930 - Comper Swift
 1932 - Cierva C.25
 1933 - Comper Mouse
 1934 - Comper Streak
 1934 - Comper Kite

Notes

References
Boughton, Terence. 1963. The Story of The British Light Aeroplane. John Murray 

Meaden, Jack & Fillmore, Malcolm. (Winter 2003). The Comper Lightplanes. Air-Britain Archive (quarterly). Air-Britain.  
Riding, Richard T. August&September 1978. British Pre-war Ultra-lights No.28: Comper Swift. Aeroplane Monthly. IPC Media
Riding, Richard T. 1987. Ultralights: The Early British Classics. Patrick Stephens  
Riding, Richard T. March 2003. Database: Comper Swift. Aeroplane Monthly. IPC Media

External links

Nick Comper official website

Defunct aircraft manufacturers of the United Kingdom
Vehicle manufacturing companies established in 1929
Vehicle manufacturing companies disestablished in 1934
1929 establishments in England
1934 disestablishments in England
British companies disestablished in 1934
British companies established in 1929